is a railway station in the city of Yurihonjō, Akita Prefecture,  Japan, operated by the third-sector  railway operator Yuri Kōgen Railway.

Lines
Yoshizawa Station is served by the Chōkai Sanroku Line, and is located 17.1 kilometers from the terminus of the line at Ugo-Honjō Station.

Station layout
The station has one side platform, serving one bi-directional track. The station is unattended.

Adjacent stations

History
Yoshizawa Station opened on October 29, 1989.

Surrounding area

See also
List of railway stations in Japan

External links

Railway stations in Akita Prefecture
Railway stations in Japan opened in 1989
Yurihonjō